Overmatch is a concept in modern military thinking which prizes having overwhelming advantages over an adversary to a more significant margin than in traditional warfare. It is related to military superiority. Overmatch uses a military force's "capabilities or unique tactics" to compel the opposing forces to stop using their own equipment or tactics, as doing so would lead to their own defeat or destruction. By fielding the right mix of capabilities, the commander can present multiple dilemmas to the enemy, thus compelling the enemy to withdraw.

Definition
According to the US Army, the definition of overmatch is "the concept where my (insert lethality system here) can willfully and without prejudice or luck defeat your (insert your protective system here)."

According to Raytheon, overmatch is a verb which means "to defeat threats at every level – strategic, tactical and technological."

According to Ben Barry, "overmatch is a very polite, clinical way of saying could be defeated.”

Example — AI versus human pilots
AI agents are not subject to the physiological constraints of a human pilot, such as the danger of flying at low altitude, or the g-forces of the aircraft accelerations. Human pilots noted that the AI agents flew with fine motor control. In the 2020 AlphaDogfight Trials (see image to the right), the AI agents battled for the chance to dogfight an expert human pilot. The winning AI agent consistently defeated an expert human pilot. The technology will be installed in actual aircraft by 2024.

Note: DoD's Joint AI Center (JAIC) has convened 100 online participants from 13 countries to discuss how to use AI in a way that is consonant with their national ethical principles, termed the 'AI Partnership for Defense' in 2020.

One possible application is to elevate the role of human pilots to mission commanders, leaving AIs as wingmen to perform as high-skill operators of low-cost robotic craft.

History
After the end of major operations in the Global War on Terror the US Army emphasized overmatch in their modernization effort.

In 2017 a task force was formed to modernize the Army. Its recommendation was to form the Army Futures Command, to engage in systematic development of capabilities to overmatch its adversaries.

In 2021 the 40th Chief of Staff of the Army identified

Analysis
Overmatch has been criticized as unsustainable in the long term and requiring immense investments in the military and cutting-edge technologies.

See also
 Air supremacy
 Cauldron
 Full-spectrum dominance
 OODA loop
 Overkill

References

Military theory